John Kerr was a 19th-century Member of Parliament in Auckland, New Zealand.

References

Members of the New Zealand House of Representatives
Year of death missing
Year of birth missing
New Zealand MPs for Auckland electorates
19th-century New Zealand politicians
Date of birth unknown
People from Auckland